Highway 72 (AR 72, Ark. 72, and Hwy. 72) is a designation for two east–west state highways in Benton County, Arkansas. A western route of  runs east from Highway 43 at Maysville to U.S. Route 71B (US 71B) in Bentonville. A second route of  begins at Interstate 49/US Route 71 (I-49/US 71) in Bentonville and runs northeast to US 62 near Avoca. The route is one of the original Arkansas state highways.

Route description

Maysville to Bentonville
The route begins at Highway 43 in Maysville and runs east to Gravette. Highway 72 intersects Highway 59 in Gravette near the Kansas City Southern Railway Caboose No. 383 on the National Register of Historic Places. The highway continues east past the Banks House to the community of Hiwasse within Gravette, having an interchange with I-49 just west of the community, where the highway passes the Hiwasse Bank Building. The highway runs southeast into Centerton, having another interchange with I-49 southeast of Hiwasee. Highway 72 has a junction with Highway 102B before entering Bentonville. In Bentonville the highway becomes Central Avenue, running east through subdivisions until meeting US 71B and terminating a few blocks west of the Bentonville town square.

Bentonville to Avoca
Highway 72 begins at I-49/US 71 in Bentonville and runs northeast to Pea Ridge. The highway has an overlap with Highway 94 through Pea Ridge before turning southeast and runs through Pea Ridge National Military Park. South of the park Highway 72 terminates at US 62.

History
Between Bentonville and Gravette, Highway 72 follows a former alignment of U.S. Route 71. In the late 1990s Highway 72 was rerouted away from downtown Bentonville along US 71B, Highway 102, and Highway 112.

Major intersections

Bentonville spur

Highway 72 Spur (AR 72B, Ark. 72B, and Hwy. 72B) is a former spur route in Bentonville. Its southern terminus was at an intersection with U.S. Route 71 (now U.S. Route 71B ) with a northern terminus at an intersection with Arkansas Highway 72 (aka Central Ave) in Bentonville.

See also

References

External links

072
Transportation in Benton County, Arkansas
Bentonville, Arkansas
Pea Ridge, Arkansas
U.S. Route 71